Moshtagh Hossain Yaghoubi (in Dari: مشتاق حسین یعقوبی) aka Mosa (born 8 November 1994) is an Afghan-born Finnish footballer who plays for SJK.

Early life
Moshtagh Yaghoubi was born on 8 November 1994 to an ethnic Hazara family in Kabul, Afghanistan.

Youth career
Yaghoubi grew up in Finland and started playing football at the age of 13 with his local club HaPa. After playing in the youth teams of MP, HJK and PK-35 he joined Honka in 2011.

Club career

Honka
Yaghoubi made his debut for Honka against KuPS on 13 October 2011. Yaghoubi scored his first goal on 27 May 2012 against FC Haka. Yaghoubi made his Europa League debut on 18 July 2013 in the 2013–14 UEFA Europa League second qualifying round where Honka lost 1–3 in the first leg to 2012–13 Ekstraklasa runners up Lech Poznań.

Pallohonka
Yaghoubi played 1 season on loan for the second team of FC Honka. He played 22 games and scored 2 goals. After his loan he returned to FC Honka.

Spartaks Jūrmala
In February 2014 Yaghoubi was transferred to the Latvian Higher League club FK Spartaks Jūrmala, signing a three-year contract. He was given shirtnumber 7.

Dynamo Moscow
Soon after his move to Spartaks Jūrmala he immediately was loaned to the Russian Premier League side Dynamo Moscow. Yaghoubi was given shirt number 61 in the first team, but did not make any appearances for them, mostly remaining on the bench and being involved in the reserve team action.

Return to Spartaks Jūrmala
In August 2014 he returned to Spartaks Jūrmala. Yaghoubi scored his first Latvian Higher League goal on 26 October 2014 in a 1–0 victory over FK Daugava Rīga.

RoPS
On 5 March 2015 he signed a contract with RoPS which is a football team in the Finland Veikkausliiga. He made his debut against SJK on 17 March 2015. He scored his first goal against FC Inter Turku in the Suomen Cup. He ended the season with a second place in the Finnish league. He scored 4 goals and made 5 assists. He won at the end of the season the Best Midfielder award for his club and the Best Midfielder award for the Finland U21.

Shakhter Karagandy
In February 2016, Yaghoubi went on trial with Kazakhstan Premier League side FC Shakhter Karagandy. On 17 March 2016, Yaghoubi signed a season-long loan deal with Shakhter Karagandy. Yaghoubi's loan was terminated by Shakhter Karagandy on 17 June 2016.

HJK Helsinki
On 4 November 2016, HJK Helsinki announced the signing of Yaghoubi.

SJK Seinäjoki
On 31 January 2019, Seinäjoen Jalkapallokerho announced the signing of Yaghoubi.

HIFK
After a season at Seinäjoen Jalkapallokerho, it was announced on 29 November 2019, that Yaghoubi would join HIFK from 2020, signing a deal until the end of 2021 with the club. He got shirt number 7.

AC Oulu
On 18 December 2021, he joined AC Oulu on a two-year contract.

International career

Finland U21
Yaghoubi acquired Finnish nationality in 2013 and got called up for Finland national under-21 team for 2015 UEFA European Under-21 Football Championship qualification match against Lithuania on 11 June 2013.
Yaghoubi scored his national team debut goal when Finland beat Wales U-21 5–1 in UEFA Under-21 Championship qualification on  14 August 2013.

Finland
On 31 October 2013 Yaghoubi made his debut for Finland national football team in an unofficial 4–2 friendly match loss to Mexico. He eventually made his official debut for Finland in a 2018 FIFA World Cup qualification match against  Turkey. He came on the field in the 67th minute for Sakari Mattila.

Career statistics

Club

International 

Scores and results list Finland's goal tally first, score column indicates score after each Finland goal.

Honours
Individual
Veikkausliiga Midfielder of the Year: 2015

Personal life
Yaghoubi was born in Kabul, Afghanistan, to ethnic Hazara parents. Yaghoubi and his family fled Afghanistan in 1999 to settle down in Tehran, Iran. After living seven years in Iran his family applied for asylum in Finland.

Yaghoubi has a tattoo on his left arm with the name of his late father Gholam Sakhi.

References

External links

 
 
 

1994 births
Living people
Finnish footballers
Finland youth international footballers
Finland under-21 international footballers
Finland international footballers
Afghan footballers
Afghan emigrants to Finland
Finnish people of Hazara descent
Hazara sportspeople
People from Kabul
Finnish people of Afghan descent
Sportspeople of Afghan descent
FC Honka players
Pallohonka players
FK Spartaks Jūrmala players
FC Dynamo Moscow reserves players
Rovaniemen Palloseura players
FC Shakhter Karagandy players
Helsingin Jalkapalloklubi players
Seinäjoen Jalkapallokerho players
HIFK Fotboll players
AC Oulu players
Veikkausliiga players
Kakkonen players
Latvian Higher League players
Kazakhstan Premier League players
Association football midfielders
Finnish expatriate sportspeople in Latvia
Finnish expatriate sportspeople in Russia
Finnish expatriate sportspeople in Kazakhstan
Expatriate footballers in Latvia
Expatriate footballers in Russia
Expatriate footballers in Kazakhstan
Naturalized citizens of Finland